Techno is a genre of electronic dance music (EDM) which is generally produced for use in a continuous DJ set, with tempo often varying between 120 and 150 beats per minute (bpm). The central rhythm is typically in common time (4/4) and often characterized by a repetitive four on the floor beat. Artists may use electronic instruments such as drum machines, sequencers, and synthesizers, as well as digital audio workstations. Drum machines from the 1980s such as Roland's TR-808 and TR-909 are highly prized, and software emulations of such retro instruments are popular.

Much of the instrumentation in techno emphasizes the role of rhythm over other musical parameters. Techno tracks mainly progress over manipulation of timbral characteristics of synthesizer presets and, unlike forms of EDM that tend to be produced with synthesizer keyboards, techno does not always strictly adhere to the harmonic practice of Western music and such structures are often ignored in favor of timbral manipulation alone. Another distinguishing feature of techno music and techno aesthetic is the general embracement of creative use of music production technology.

Use of the term "techno" to refer to a type of electronic music originated in Germany in the early 1980s. In 1988, following the UK release of the compilation Techno! The New Dance Sound of Detroit, the term came to be associated with a form of EDM produced in Detroit. Detroit techno resulted from the melding of synth-pop by artists such as Kraftwerk, Giorgio Moroder and Yellow Magic Orchestra with African American styles such as house, electro, and funk. Added to this is the influence of futuristic and science-fiction themes relevant to life in American late capitalist society, with Alvin Toffler's book The Third Wave a notable point of reference. The music produced in the mid-to-late 1980s by Juan Atkins, Derrick May, and Kevin Saunderson (collectively known as The Belleville Three), along with Eddie Fowlkes, Blake Baxter, James Pennington and others is viewed as the first wave of techno from Detroit.

After the success of house music in a number of European countries, techno grew in popularity in the UK, Germany, Belgium and the Netherlands. In Europe regional variants quickly evolved and by the early 1990s techno subgenres such as acid, hardcore, bleep, ambient, and dub techno had developed. Music journalists and fans of techno are generally selective in their use of the term, so a clear distinction can be made between sometimes related but often qualitatively different styles, such as tech house and trance.

Detroit techno

In exploring Detroit techno's origins writer Kodwo Eshun maintains that "Kraftwerk are to techno what Muddy Waters is to the Rolling Stones: the authentic, the origin, the real." Juan Atkins has acknowledged that he had an early enthusiasm for Kraftwerk and Giorgio Moroder, particularly Moroder's work with Donna Summer and the producer's own album E=MC2. Atkins also mentions that "around 1980 I had a tape of nothing but Kraftwerk, Telex, Devo, Giorgio Moroder and Gary Numan, and I'd ride around in my car playing it." Regarding his initial impression of Kraftwerk, Atkins notes that they were "clean and precise" relative to the "weird UFO sounds" featured in his seemingly "psychedelic" music.

Derrick May identified the influence of Kraftwerk and other European synthesizer music in commenting that "it was just classy and clean, and to us it was beautiful, like outer space. Living around Detroit, there was so little beauty... everything is an ugly mess in Detroit, and so we were attracted to this music. It, like, ignited our imagination!". May has commented that he considered his music a direct continuation of the European synthesizer tradition. He also identified Japanese synthpop act Yellow Magic Orchestra, particularly member Ryuichi Sakamoto, and British band Ultravox, as influences, along with Kraftwerk. YMO's song "Technopolis" (1979), a tribute to Tokyo as an electronic mecca, is considered an "interesting contribution" to the development of Detroit techno, foreshadowing concepts that Atkins and Davis would later explore with Cybotron.

Kevin Saunderson has also acknowledged the influence of Europe but he claims to have been more inspired by the idea of making music with electronic equipment: "I was more infatuated with the idea that I can do this all myself."

These early Detroit techno artists additionally employed science fiction imagery to articulate their visions of a transformed society.

School days
Prior to achieving notoriety, Atkins, Saunderson, May, and Fowlkes shared common interests as budding musicians, "mix" tape traders, and aspiring DJs. They also found musical inspiration via the Midnight Funk Association, an eclectic five-hour late-night radio program hosted on various Detroit radio stations, including WCHB, WGPR, and WJLB-FM from 1977 through the mid-1980s by DJ Charles "The Electrifying Mojo" Johnson. Mojo's show featured electronic music by artists such as Giorgio Moroder, Kraftwerk, Yellow Magic Orchestra and Tangerine Dream, alongside the funk sounds of acts such as Parliament Funkadelic and dance oriented new wave music by bands like Devo and the B-52's. Atkins has noted:

Despite the short-lived disco boom in Detroit, it had the effect of inspiring many individuals to take up mixing, Juan Atkins among them. Subsequently, Atkins taught May how to mix records, and in 1981, "Magic Juan", Derrick "Mayday", in conjunction with three other DJ's, one of whom was Eddie "Flashin" Fowlkes, launched themselves as a party crew called Deep Space Soundworks (also referred to as Deep Space). In 1980 or 1981 they met with Mojo and proposed that they provide mixes for his show, which they did end up doing the following year.

During the late 1970s-early 1980s high school clubs such as Brats, Charivari, Ciabattino, Comrades, Gables, Hardwear, Rafael, Rumours, Snobs, and Weekends allowed the young promoters to develop and nurture a local dance music scene. As the local scene grew in popularity, DJs began to band together to market their mixing skills and sound systems to clubs that were hoping to attract larger audiences. Local church activity centers, vacant warehouses, offices, and YMCA auditoriums were the early locations where the musical form was nurtured.

Juan Atkins

Of the four individuals responsible for establishing techno as a genre in its own right, Juan Atkins is widely cited as "The Originator". In 1995, the American music technology publication Keyboard Magazine honored him as one of 12 Who Count in the history of keyboard music.

In the early 1980s, Atkins began recording with musical partner Richard Davis (and later with a third member, Jon-5) as Cybotron. This trio released a number of rock and electro-inspired tunes, the most successful of which were Clear (1983) and its moodier followup, "Techno City" (1984).

Atkins used the term techno to describe Cybotron's music, taking inspiration from Futurist author Alvin Toffler, the original source for words such as cybotron and metroplex. Atkins has described earlier synthesizer based acts like Kraftwerk as techno, although many would consider both Kraftwerk's and Juan's Cybotron outputs as electro. Atkins viewed Cybotron's Cosmic Cars (1982) as unique, Germanic, synthesized funk, but he later heard Afrika Bambaataa's "Planet Rock" (1982) and considered it to be a superior example of the music he envisioned. Inspired, he resolved to continue experimenting, and he encouraged Saunderson and May to do likewise.<ref>Cosgrove 1988b. "At the time, [Atkins] believed ["Techno City"] was a unique and adventurous piece of synthesizer funk, more in tune with Germany than the rest of black America, but on a dispiriting visit to New York, Juan heard Afrika Bambaataa's 'Planet Rock' and realized that his vision of a spartan electronic dance sound had been upstaged. He returned to Detroit and renewed his friendship with two younger students from Belleville High, Kevin Saunderson and Derrick May, and quietly over the next few years the three of them became the creative backbone of Detroit Techno. "Techno City" was released in 1984. Sicko 1999:73 clarifies Atkins was in New York in 1982, trying to get Cybotron's "Cosmic Cars" into the hands of radio DJs, when he first heard "Planet Rock"; so "Cosmic Cars", not "Techno City", is the unique and adventurous piece of synthesizer funk.</ref>

Eventually, Atkins started producing his own music under the pseudonym Model 500, and in 1985 he established the record label Metroplex. The same year saw an important turning point for the Detroit scene with the release of Model 500's "No UFO's," a seminal work that is generally considered the first techno production.Butler 2006:43"In 1985 Juan Atkins released the first record on his fledgling label Metroplex, 'No UFO's', now widely regarded as Year Zero of the techno movement." Cox, T. (2008), Model 500:Remake/remodel, interview with Atkins and Mike Banks hosted on www.residentadvisor.net Of this time, Atkins has said:

Chicago

The music's producers, especially May and Saunderson, admit to having been fascinated by the Chicago club scene and influenced by house in particular. May's 1987 hit "Strings of Life" (released under the alias Rhythim Is Rhythim) is considered a classic in both the house and techno genres. "RIR singles like 'Strings of Life'...are among the few classics in the debased world of techno"

Juan Atkins also believes that the first acid house producers, seeking to distance house music from disco, emulated the techno sound. Atkins also suggests that the Chicago house sound developed as a result of Frankie Knuckles' using a drum machine he bought from Derrick May. He claims:

In the UK, a club following for house music grew steadily from 1985, with interest sustained by scenes in London, Manchester, Nottingham, and later Sheffield and Leeds. The DJs thought to be responsible for house's early UK success include Mike Pickering, Mark Moore, Colin Faver, and Graeme Park.

Detroit sound

The early producers, enabled by the increasing affordability of sequencers and synthesizers, merged a European synthpop aesthetic with aspects of soul, funk, disco, and electro, pushing EDM into uncharted terrain. They deliberately rejected the Motown legacy and traditional formulas of R&B and soul, and instead embraced technological experimentation.Cosgrove 1988a. Although the Detroit dance music has been casually lumped in with the jack virus of Chicago house, the young techno producers of the Seventh City claim to have their own sound, music that goes 'beyond the beat', creating a hybrid of post-punk, funkadelia and electro-disco...a mesmerizing underground of new dance which blends European industrial pop with black American garage funk...If the techno scene worships any gods, they are a pretty deranged deity, according to Derrick May. "The music is just like Detroit, a complete mistake. It's like George Clinton and Kraftwerk stuck in an elevator." ...And strange as it may seem, the techno scene looked to Europe, to Heaven 17, Depeche Mode and the Human League for its inspiration. ...[Says an Underground Resistance-related group] "Techno is all about simplicity. We don't want to compete with Jimmy Jam and Terry Lewis. Modern R&B has too many rules: big snare sounds, big bass and even bigger studio bills." Techno is probably the first form of contemporary black music which categorically breaks with the old heritage of soul music. Unlike Chicago House, which has a lingering obsession with seventies Philly, and unlike New York Hip Hop with its deconstructive attack on James Brown's back catalogue, Detroit Techno refutes the past. It may have a special place for Parliament and Pete Shelley, but it prefers tomorrow's technology to yesterday's heroes. Techno is a post-soul sound...For the young black underground in Detroit, emotion crumbles at the feet of technology. ...Despite Detroit's rich musical history, the young techno stars have little time for the golden era of Motown. Juan Atkins of Model 500 is convinced there is little to be gained from the motor-city legacy... "Say what you like about our music," says Blake Baxter, "but don't call us the new Motown...we're the second coming."Rietveld 1998:124–127

The resulting Detroit sound was interpreted by Derrick May and one journalist in 1988 as a "post-soul" sound with no debt to Motown, but by another journalist a decade later as "soulful grooves" melding the beat-centric styles of Motown with the music technology of the time. May described the sound of techno as something that is "...like Detroit...a complete mistake. It's like George Clinton and Kraftwerk are stuck in an elevator with only a sequencer to keep them company." Juan Atkins has stated that it is "music that sounds like technology, and not technology that sounds like music, meaning that most of the music you listen to is made with technology, whether you know it or not. But with techno music, you know it."

One of the first Detroit productions to receive wider attention was Derrick May's "Strings of Life" (1987), which, together with May's previous release, "Nude Photo" (1987), helped raise techno's profile in Europe, especially the UK and Germany, during the 1987–1988 house music boom (see Second Summer of Love). It became May's best known track, which, according to Frankie Knuckles, "just exploded. It was like something you can't imagine, the kind of power and energy people got off that record when it was first heard. Mike Dunn says he has no idea how people can accept a record that doesn't have a bassline."

Acid house

By 1988, house music had exploded in the UK, and acid house was increasingly popular. There was also a long-established warehouse party subculture based around the sound system scene. In 1988, the music played at warehouse parties was predominantly house. That same year, the Balearic party vibe associated with Ibiza-based DJ Alfredo Fiorito was transported to London, when Danny Rampling and Paul Oakenfold opened the clubs Shoom and Spectrum, respectively. Both night spots quickly became synonymous with acid house, and it was during this period that the use of MDMA, as a party drug, started to gain prominence. Other important UK clubs at this time included Back to Basics in Leeds, Sheffield's Leadmill and Music Factory, and in Manchester The Haçienda, where Mike Pickering and Graeme Park's Friday night spot, Nude, was an important proving ground for American underground dance music. Acid house party fever escalated in London and Manchester, and it quickly became a cultural phenomenon. MDMA-fueled club goers, faced with 2 A.M. closing hours, sought refuge in the warehouse party scene that ran all night. To escape the attention of the press and the authorities, this after-hours activity quickly went underground. Within a year, however, up to 10,000 people at a time were attending the first commercially organized mass parties, called raves, and a media storm ensued.

The success of house and acid house paved the way for wider acceptance of the Detroit sound, and vice versa: techno was initially supported by a handful of house music clubs in Chicago, New York, and Northern England, with London clubs catching up later; but in 1987, it was "Strings of Life" which eased London club-goers into acceptance of house, according to DJ Mark Moore.Cosgrove 1988a. Although it can now be heard in Detroit's leading clubs, the local area has shown a marked reluctance to get behind the music. It has been in clubs like the Powerplant (Chicago), The World (New York), The Hacienda (Manchester), Rock City (Nottingham) and Downbeat (Leeds) where the techno sound has found most support. Ironically, the only Detroit club which really championed the sound was a peripatetic party night called Visage, which unromantically shared its name with one of Britain's oldest new romantic groups.

The New Dance Sound of Detroit

The mid-1988 UK release of Techno! The New Dance Sound of Detroit, an album compiled by ex-Northern Soul DJ and Kool Kat Records boss Neil Rushton (at the time an A&R scout for Virgin's "10 Records" imprint) and Derrick May, introduced of the word techno to UK audiences. Although the compilation put techno into the lexicon of music journalism in the UK, the music was initially viewed as Detroit's interpretation of Chicago house rather than as a separate genre. Detroit's "techno" ... and many more stylistic outgrowths have occurred since the word "house" gained national currency in 1985. The compilation's working title had been The House Sound of Detroit until the addition of Atkins' song "Techno Music" prompted reconsideration. Rushton was later quoted as saying he, Atkins, May, and Saunderson came up with the compilation's final name together, and that the Belleville Three voted down calling the music some kind of regional brand of house; they instead favored a term they were already using, techno.

Derrick May views this as one of his busiest times and recalls that it was a period where he 

Commercially, the release did not fare as well and failed to recoup, but Inner City's production "Big Fun" (1988), a track that was almost not included on the compilation, became a crossover hit in fall 1988. The record was also responsible for bringing industry attention to May, Atkins and Saunderson, which led to discussions with ZTT records about forming a techno supergroup called Intellex. But, when the group were on the verge of finalising their contract, May allegedly refused to agree to Top of the Pops appearances and negotiations collapsed. According to May, ZTT label boss Trevor Horn had envisaged that the trio would be marketed as a "black Petshop Boys."

Despite Virgin Records' disappointment with the poor sales of Rushton's compilation, the record was successful in establishing an identity for techno and was instrumental in creating a platform in Europe for both the music and its producers. Ultimately, the release served to distinguish the Detroit sound from Chicago house and other forms of underground dance music that were emerging during the rave era of the late 1980s and early 1990s, a period during which techno became more adventurous and distinct.Sicko 1999:102. Once Rushton and Atkins set techno apart with the Techno! compilation, the music took off on its own course, no longer parallel to the Windy City's progeny. And as the 1980s came to a close, the difference between techno and house music became increasingly pronounced, with techno's instrumentation growing more and more adventurous.

Music Institute
In mid-1988, developments in the Detroit scene led to the opening of a nightclub called the Music Institute (MI), located at 1315 Broadway in downtown Detroit. The venue was secured by George Baker and Alton Miller with Darryl Wynn and Derrick May participating as Friday night DJs, and Baker and Chez Damier playing to a mostly gay crowd on Saturday nights.

The club closed on 24 November 1989, with Derrick May playing "Strings of Life" along with a recording of clock tower bells. May explains:

Though short-lived, MI was known internationally for its all-night sets, its sparse white rooms, and its juice bar stocked with "smart drinks" (the Institute never served liquor). The MI, notes Dan Sicko, along with Detroit's early techno pioneers, "helped give life to one of the city's important musical subcultures – one that was slowly growing into an international scene."

German techno

In 1982, while working at Frankfurt's City Music record store, DJ Talla 2XLC started to use the term techno to categorize artists such as New Order, Depeche Mode, Kraftwerk, Heaven 17 and Front 242, with the word used as shorthand for technologically created dance music. Talla's categorization became a point of reference for other DJs, including Sven Väth. Talla further popularized the term in Germany when he founded Technoclub at Frankfurt's No Name Club in 1984, which later moved to the Dorian Gray club in 1987. Talla's club spot served as the hub for the regional EBM and electronic music scene, and according to Jürgen Laarmann, of Frontpage magazine, it had historical merit in being the first club in Germany to play almost exclusively EDM.

Frankfurt tape scene
Inspired by Talla's music selection, in the early 80s several young artists from Frankfurt started to experiment on cassette tapes with electronic music coming from the City Music record store, mixing the latest catalogue with additional electronic sounds and pitched BPM. This became known as the Frankfurt tape scene.

The Frankfurt tape scene evolved around the early and experimental work done by the likes of Tobias Freund, Uwe Schmidt, Lars Müller and Martin Schopf. Some of the work done by Andreas Tomalla, Markus Nikolai and Thomas Franzmann evolved in collaborative work under the Bigod 20 collective. While this early work was strongly characterized as experimental electronic music fused with strong EBM, krautrock, synthpop and technopop influences, the later work during the mid and late 80's clearly transitioned to a clear techno sound.

Influence of Chicago and Detroit
By 1987 a German party scene based around the Chicago sound was well established. In the late 1980s, acid house also established itself in West Germany as a new trend in clubs and discotheques. In 1988, the Ufo opened in West Berlin, an illegal venue for acid house parties, which existed until 1990. In Munich at this time, the Negerhalle (1983–1989) and the ETA-Halle established themselves as the first acid house clubs in temporarily used, dilapidated industrial halls, marking the beginning of the so-called "hall culture" in Germany.

In July 1989 Dr. Motte and Danielle de Picciotto organized the first Love Parade in West Berlin, just a few months before the Fall of the Berlin Wall. 

Growth of German scene

Following the fall of the Berlin Wall on 9 November 1989 and the German reunification in October 1990, free underground techno parties mushroomed in East Berlin. East German DJ Paul van Dyk has remarked that techno was a major force in reestablishing social connections between East and West Germany during the unification period. In the now reunified Berlin, several locations opened near the foundations of the Berlin Wall in the former eastern part of the city from 1991 onwards: the Tresor (est. 1991), the Planet (1991–1993), the Bunker (1992–1996), and the E-Werk (1993–1997).Henkel, O.; Wolff, K. (1996) Berlin Underground: Techno und Hiphop; Zwischen Mythos und Ausverkauf, Berlin: FAB Verlag, (pp. 81–83). It was in Tresor at this time that a trend in paramilitary clothing was established (amongst the techno fraternity) by DJ Tanith; possibly as an expression of a commitment to the underground aesthetic of the music, or perhaps influenced by UR's paramilitary posturing. In the same period, German DJs began intensifying the speed and abrasiveness of the sound, as an acid infused techno began transmuting into hardcore. DJ Tanith commented at the time that "Berlin was always hardcore, hardcore hippie, hardcore punk, and now we have a very hardcore house sound." This emerging sound is thought to have been influenced by Dutch gabber and Belgian hardcore; styles that were in their own perverse way paying homage to Underground Resistance and Richie Hawtin's Plus 8 Records. Other influences on the development of this style were European electronic body music (EBM) groups of the mid-1980s such as DAF, Front 242, and Nitzer Ebb.

Changes were also taking place in Frankfurt during the same period but it did not share the egalitarian approach found in the Berlin party scene. It was instead very much centered around discothèques and existing arrangements with various club owners. In 1988, after the Omen opened, the Frankfurt dance music scene was allegedly dominated by the club's management and they made it difficult for other promoters to get a start. By the early 1990s Sven Väth had become perhaps the first DJ in Germany to be worshipped like a rock star. He performed center stage with his fans facing him, and as co-owner of Omen, he is believed to have been the first techno DJ to run his own club. One of the few real alternatives then was The Bruckenkopf in Mainz, underneath a Rhine bridge, a venue that offered a non-commercial alternative to Frankfurt's discothèque-based clubs. Other notable underground parties were those run by Force Inc. Music Works and Ata & Heiko from Playhouse records (Ongaku Musik). By 1992 DJ Dag & Torsten Fenslau were running a Sunday morning session at Dorian Gray, a plush discothèque near the Frankfurt airport. They initially played a mix of different styles including Belgian new beat, Deep House, Chicago House, and synthpop such as Kraftwerk and Yello and it was out of this blend of styles that the Frankfurt trance scene is believed to have emerged.

In 1990, the Babalu Club, the first afterhours techno  club in Germany, opened in Munich and was a place for the formation of the southern German techno scene, where protagonists such as DJ Hell, Monika Kruse, Tom Novy or Woody came together.

In 1993-94 rave became a mainstream music phenomenon in Germany, seeing with it a return to "melody, New Age elements, insistently kitsch harmonies and timbres". This undermining of the German underground sound lead to the consolidation of a German "rave establishment," spearheaded by the party organisation Mayday, with its record label Low Spirit, WestBam, Marusha, and a music channel called VIVA. At this time the German popular music charts were riddled with Low Spirit "pop-Tekno" German folk music reinterpretations of tunes such as "Somewhere Over The Rainbow" and "Tears Don't Lie", many of which became hits. At the same time, in Frankfurt, a supposed alternative was a music characterized by Simon Reynolds as "moribund, middlebrow Electro-Trance music, as represented by Frankfurt's own Sven Väth and his Harthouse label." Illegal raves, however, regained importance in the German techno scene as a countermovement to the commercial mass raves in the mid-1990s.

Tekkno versus techno

In Germany, fans started to refer to the harder techno sound emerging in the early 1990s as Tekkno (or Brett). This alternative spelling, with varying numbers of ks, began as a tongue-in-cheek attempt to emphasize the music's hardness, but by the mid-1990s it came to be associated with a controversial point of view that the music was and perhaps always had been wholly separate from Detroit's techno, deriving instead from a 1980s EBM-oriented club scene cultivated in part by DJ/musician Talla 2XLC in Frankfurt.

At some point tension over "who defines techno" arose between scenes in Frankfurt and Berlin. DJ Tanith has expressed that Techno as a term already existed in Germany but was to a large extent undefined. Dimitri Hegemann has stated that the Frankfurt definition of techno associated with Talla's Technoclub differed from that used in Berlin. Frankfurt's Armin Johnert viewed techno as having its roots in acts such DAF, Cabaret Voltaire, and Suicide, but a younger generation of club goers had a perception of the older EBM and Industrial as handed down and outdated. The Berlin scene offered an alternative and many began embracing an imported sound that was being referred to as Techno-House. The move away from EBM had started in Berlin when acid house became popular, thanks to Monika Dietl's radio show on SFB 4. Tanith distinguished acid-based dance music from the earlier approaches, whether it be DAF or Nitzer Ebb, because the latter was aggressive, he felt that it epitomized "being against something," but of acid house he said, "it's electronic, it's fun it's nice." By Spring 1990, Tanith, along with Wolle XDP, an East-Berlin party organizer responsible for the X-tasy Dance Project, were organizing the first large scale rave events in Germany. This development would lead to a permanent move away from the sound associated with Techno-House and toward a hard edged mix of music that came to define Tanith and Wolle's Tekknozid parties. According to Wolle it was an "out and out rejection of disco values," instead they created a "sound storm" and encouraged a form of "dance floor socialism," where the DJ was not placed in the middle and you "lose yourself in light and sound."

Developments

As the techno sound evolved in the late 1980s and early 1990s, it also diverged to such an extent that a wide spectrum of stylistically distinct music was being referred to as techno. This ranged from relatively pop oriented acts such as Moby to the distinctly anti-commercial sentiments of Underground Resistance. Derrick May's experimentation on works such as Beyond the Dance (1989) and The Beginning (1990) were credited with taking techno "in dozens of new directions at once and having the kind of expansive impact John Coltrane had on Jazz". The Birmingham-based label Network Records label was instrumental in introducing Detroit techno to British audiences. By the early 1990s, the original techno sound had garnered a large underground following in the United Kingdom, Germany, the Netherlands and Belgium. The growth of techno's popularity in Europe between 1988 and 1992 was largely due to the emergence of the rave scene and a thriving club culture.

American exodus
In the United States during the early 90s, apart from regional scenes in Detroit, New York City, Chicago and Orlando, interest in techno was limited. Many Detroit based producers, frustrated by the lack of opportunity in the US, looked to Europe for a future livelihood. This first wave of Detroit expatriates was soon joined by a so-called "second wave" that included Carl Craig, Octave One, Jay Denham, Kenny Larkin, Stacey Pullen, and UR's Jeff Mills, Mike Banks, and Robert Hood. In the same period, close to Detroit (Windsor, Ontario), Richie Hawtin, with business partner John Acquaviva, launched the techno imprint Plus 8 Records. A number of New York producers also made an impression in Europe at this time, most notably Frankie Bones, Lenny Dee, and Joey Beltram .

These developments in American-produced techno between 1990 and 1992 fueled the expansion and eventual divergence of techno in Europe, particularly in Germany.Reynolds 2006:228–229 In Berlin, the club Tresor which had opened in 1991 for a time was the standard bearer for techno and played host to many of the leading Detroit producers, some of whom had relocated to Berlin. The club brought new life to the careers of Detroit artists such as Santonio Echols, Eddie Fowlkes and Blake Baxter, who played there alongside established Berlin DJs such as Dr. Motte and Tanith. According to Dan Sicko, "Germany's growing scene in the early 1990s was the beginning of techno's decentralization", and "techno began to create its second logical center in Berlin". At this time, the now reunified Berlin also began to regain its position as the musical capital of Germany.

Although eclipsed by Germany, Belgium was another focus of second-wave techno in this time period. The Ghent-based label R&S Records embraced harder-edged techno by "teenage prodigies" like Beltram and C.J. Bolland, releasing "tough, metallic tracks...with harsh, discordant synth lines that sounded like distressed Hoovers," according to one music journalist.

In the United Kingdom, Sub Club which opened in Glasgow in 1987, and Trade which opened its doors to Londoners in 1990, were venues which helped bring techno into the country. Trade has been referred to as the 'original all night bender'.

A Techno Alliance
In 1993, the German techno label Tresor Records released the compilation album Tresor II: Berlin & Detroit – A Techno Alliance, a testament to the influence of the Detroit sound upon the German techno scene and a celebration of a "mutual admiration pact" between the two cities. As the mid-1990s approached, Berlin was becoming a haven for Detroit producers; Jeff Mills and Blake Baxter even resided there for a time. In the same period, with the assistance of Tresor, Underground Resistance released their X-101/X-102/X103 album series, Juan Atkins collaborated with 3MB's Thomas Fehlmann and Moritz Von Oswald and Tresor-affiliated label Basic Channel had its releases mastered by Detroit's National Sound Corporation, the main mastering house for the entire Detroit dance music scene. In a sense, popular electronic music had come full circle, returning to Germany, home of a primary influence on the EDM of the 1980s: Düsseldorf's Kraftwerk. The dance sounds of Chicago and Detroit also had another German connection, as it was in Munich that Giorgio Moroder and Pete Bellotte first produced the synthesizer-generated Eurodisco sound, including the seminal four-on-the-floor track I Feel Love.

Minimal techno
As techno continued to transmute a number of Detroit producers began to question the trajectory the music was taking. One response came in the form of so-called minimal techno (a term producer Daniel Bell found difficult to accept, finding the term minimalism, in the artistic sense of the word, too "arty"). It is thought that Robert Hood, a Detroit-based producer and one time member of UR, is largely responsible for ushering in the minimal strain of techno. Hood describes the situation in the early 1990s as one where techno had become too "ravey", with increasing tempos, the emergence of gabber, and related trends straying far from the social commentary and soul-infused sound of original Detroit techno. In response, Hood and others sought to emphasize a single element of the Detroit aesthetic, interpreting techno with "a basic stripped down, raw sound. Just drums, basslines and funky grooves and only what's essential. Only what is essential to make people move". Hood explains:

Jazz influences

Some techno has also been influenced by or directly infused with elements of jazz. This led to increased sophistication in the use of both rhythm and harmony in a number of techno productions. Manchester (UK)-based techno act 808 State helped fuel this development with tracks such as "Pacific State" and "Cobra Bora" in 1989. Detroit producer Mike Banks was heavily influenced by jazz, as demonstrated on the influential Underground Resistance release Nation 2 Nation (1991). By 1993, Detroit acts such as Model 500 and UR had made explicit references to the genre, with the tracks "Jazz Is The Teacher" (1993) and "Hi-Tech Jazz" (1993), the latter being part of a larger body of work and group called Galaxy 2 Galaxy, a self-described jazz project based on Kraftwerk's "man machine" doctrine. "Galaxy 2 Galaxy is a band that was conceptualized with the first hitech Jazz record produced by UR in 1986/87 and later released in 1990 which was Nation 2 Nation (UR-005). Jeff Mills and Mike Banks had visions of Jazz music and musicians operating on the same "man machine" doctrine dropped on them from Kraftwerk. Early experiments with synthesizers and jazz by artists like Herbie Hancock, Stevie Wonder, Weather Report, Return to Forever, Larry Heard and Lenny White's Astral Pirates also pointed them in this direction. UR went on to produce and further innovate this form of music which was coined 'Hitech Jazz' by fans after the historic 1993 release of UR's Galaxy 2 Galaxy (UR-025) album which included the underground UR smash titled 'Hitech Jazz'." This lead was followed by a number of techno producers in the UK who were influenced by both jazz and UR, Dave Angel's "Seas of Tranquility" EP (1994) being a case in point,Angelic Upstart : Mixmag interview with Dave Angel detailing his interest in jazz. Retrieved from Techno.de Other notable artists who set about expanding upon the structure of "classic techno" include Dan Curtin, Morgan Geist, Titonton Duvante and Ian O'Brien.

Intelligent techno

In 1991 UK music journalist Matthew Collin wrote that "Europe may have the scene and the energy, but it's America which supplies the ideological direction...if Belgian techno gives us riffs, German techno the noise, British techno the breakbeats, then Detroit supplies the sheer cerebral depth." By 1992 a number of European producers and labels began to associate rave culture with the corruption and commercialization of the original techno ideal. Following this the notion of an intelligent or Detroit inspired pure techno aesthetic began to take hold. Detroit techno had maintained its integrity throughout the rave era and was pushing a new generation of so-called intelligent techno producers forward. Simon Reynolds suggests that this progression "involved a full-scale retreat from the most radically posthuman and hedonistically functional aspects of rave music toward more traditional ideas about creativity, namely the auteur theory of the solitary genius who humanizes technology."

The term intelligent techno was used to differentiate more sophisticated versions of underground techno  from rave-oriented styles such as breakbeat hardcore, Schranz, Dutch Gabber. Warp Records was among the first to capitalize upon this development with the release of the compilation album Artificial Intelligence Of this time, Warp founder and managing director Steve Beckett said

Warp had originally marketed Artificial Intelligence using the description electronic listening music but this was quickly replaced by intelligent techno. In the same period (1992–93) other names were also bandied about such as armchair techno, ambient techno, and electronica, but all referred to an emerging form of post-rave dance music for the "sedentary and stay at home". Following the commercial success of the compilation in the United States, Intelligent Dance Music eventually became the name most commonly used for much of the experimental dance music emerging during the mid-to-late 1990s.

Although it is primarily Warp that has been credited with ushering the commercial growth of IDM and electronica, in the early 1990s there were many notable labels associated with the initial intelligence trend that received little, if any, wider attention. Amongst others they include: Black Dog Productions (1989), Carl Craig's Planet E (1991), Kirk Degiorgio's Applied Rhythmic Technology (1991), Eevo Lute Muzique (1991), General Production Recordings (1991), In 1993, a number of new "intelligent techno"/"electronica" record labels emerged, including New Electronica, Mille Plateaux, 100% Pure (1993) and Ferox Records (1993).

Free techno

In the early 1990s a post-rave, DIY, free party scene had established itself in the UK. It was largely based around an alliance between warehouse party goers from various urban squat scenes and politically inspired new age travellers. The new agers offered a readymade network of countryside festivals that were hastily adopted by squatters and ravers alike. Prominent among the sound systems operating at this time were Exodus in Luton, Tonka in Brighton, Smokescreen in Sheffield, DiY in Nottingham, Bedlam, Circus Warp, LSDiesel and London's Spiral Tribe. The high point of this free party period came in May 1992 when with less than 24 hours notice and little publicity more than 35,000 gathered at the Castlemorton Common Festival for 5 days of partying.

This one event was largely responsible for the introduction in 1994 of the Criminal Justice and Public Order Act; effectively leaving the British free party scene for dead. Following this many of the traveller artists moved away from Britain to Europe, the US, Goa in India, Koh Phangan in Thailand and Australia's East Coast. In the rest of Europe, due in some part to the inspiration of traveling sound systems from the UK, rave enjoyed a prolonged existence as it continued to expand across the continent.

Spiral Tribe, Bedlam and other English sound systems took their cooperative techno ideas to Europe, particularly Eastern Europe where it was cheaper to live, and audiences were quick to appropriate the free party ideology. It was European Teknival free parties, such as the annual Czechtek event in the Czech Republic that gave rise to several French, German and Dutch sound systems. Many of these groups found audiences easily and were often centered around squats in cities such as Amsterdam and Berlin.

Divergence

By 1994 there were a number of techno producers in the UK and Europe building on the Detroit sound, but a number of other underground dance music styles were by then vying for attention. Some drew upon the Detroit techno aesthetic, while others fused components of preceding dance music forms. This led to the appearance (in the UK initially) of inventive new music that sounded far-removed from techno. For instance jungle (drum and bass) demonstrated influences ranging from hip hop, soul, and reggae to techno and house.

With an increasing diversification (and commercialization) of dance music, the collectivist sentiment prominent in the early rave scene diminished, each new faction having its own particular attitude and vision of how dance music (or in certain cases, non-dance music) should evolve. According to Muzik magazine, by 1995 the UK techno scene was in decline and dedicated club nights were dwindling. The music had become "too hard, too fast, too male, too drug-oriented, too anally retentive." Despite this, weekly night at clubs such as Final Frontier (London),The Orbit (leeds), House of God (Birmingham), Pure (Edinburgh, whose resident DJ Twitch later founded the more eclectic Optimo), and Bugged Out (Manchester) were still popular. With techno reaching a state of "creative palsy," and with a disproportionate number of underground dance music enthusiasts more interested in the sounds of rave and jungle, in 1995 the future of the UK techno scene looked uncertain as the market for "pure techno" waned. Muzik described the sound of UK techno at this time as "dutiful grovelling at the altar of American techno with a total unwillingness to compromise."

By the end of the 1990s, a number of post-techno  underground styles had emerged, including ghettotech (a style that combines some of the aesthetics of techno with hip-hop and house music), nortec, glitch, digital hardcore, electroclash and so-called no-beat techno.

In attempting to sum up the changes since the heyday of Detroit techno, Derrick May has since revised his famous quote in stating that "Kraftwerk got off on the third floor and now George Clinton's got Napalm Death in there with him. The elevator's stalled between the pharmacy and the athletic wear store."

Commercial exposure

While techno and its derivatives only occasionally produce commercially successful mainstream acts—Underworld and Orbital being two better-known examples—the genre has significantly affected many other areas of music. In an effort to appear relevant, many established artists, for example Madonna and U2, have dabbled with dance music, yet such endeavors have rarely evidenced a genuine understanding or appreciation of techno's origins with the former proclaiming in January 1996 that "Techno=Death".Chaplin, Julia & Michel, Sia. Fire Starters, Spin Magazine, page 40, March 1997, Spin Media LLC.

The R&B artist, Missy Elliott, exposed the popular music audience to the Detroit techno sound when she featured material from Cybotron's Clear on her 2006 release "Lose Control"; this resulted in Juan Atkins' receiving a Grammy Award nomination for his writing credit. Elliott's 2001 album Miss E... So Addictive also clearly demonstrated the influence of techno inspired club culture.

In the late 90s the publication of relatively accurate histories by authors Simon Reynolds (Generation Ecstasy, also known as Energy Flash) and Dan Sicko (Techno Rebels), plus mainstream press coverage of the Detroit Electronic Music Festival in the 2000s, helped diffuse some of the genre's more dubious mythology. Even the Detroit-based company Ford Motors eventually became savvy to the mass appeal of techno, noting that "this music was created partly by the pounding clangor of the Motor City's auto factories. It became natural for us to incorporate Detroit techno into our commercials after we discovered that young people are embracing techno." With a marketing campaign targeting under-35s, Ford used "Detroit Techno" as a print ad slogan and chose Model 500's "No UFO's" to underpin its November 2000 MTV television advertisement for the Ford Focus.

Antecedents
Early use of the term 'Techno'
In 1977, Steve Fairnie and Bev Sage formed an electronica band called the Techno Twins in London, England. When Kraftwerk first toured Japan, their music was described as "technopop" by the Japanese press. The Japanese band Yellow Magic Orchestra used the word 'techno' in a number of their works such as the song "Technopolis" (1979), the album Technodelic (1981), and a rare flexi disc EP, "The Spirit of Techno" (1983). When Yellow Magic Orchestra toured the United States in 1980, they described their own music as technopop, and were written up in Rolling Stone Magazine. Around 1980, the members of YMO added synthesizer backing tracks to idol songs such as Ikue Sakakibara's "Robot", and these songs were classified as 'techno kayou' or 'bubblegum techno.' In 1985, Billboard reviewed the Canadian band Skinny Puppy's album, and described the genre as techno dance. Juan Atkins himself said "In fact, there were a lot of electronic musicians around when Cybotron started, and I think maybe half of them referred to their music as 'techno.' However, the public really wasn't ready for it until about '85 or '86. It just so happened that Detroit was there when people really got into it."

Proto-techno
The popularity of Euro disco and Italo disco—referred to as progressive in Detroit—and new romantic synthpop in the Detroit high school party scene from which techno emerged has prompted a number of commentators to try to redefine the origins of techno by incorporating musical precursors to the Detroit sound as part of a wider historical survey of the genre's development.Brewster 2006:343–346 The search for a mythical "first techno record" leads such commentators to consider music from long before the 1988 naming of the genre. Aside from the artists whose music was popular in the Detroit high school scene ("progressive" disco acts such as Giorgio Moroder, Alexander Robotnick, and Claudio Simonetti and synthpop artists such as Visage, New Order, Depeche Mode, The Human League, and Heaven 17), they point to examples such as "Sharevari" (1981) by A Number of Names, danceable selections from Kraftwerk (1977–83), the earliest compositions by Cybotron (1981), Moroder's "From Here to Eternity" (1977), and Manuel Göttsching's "proto-techno masterpiece" E2-E4 (1981). The song I Feel Love, produced by Giorgio Moroder for Donna Summer in 1976, has been described as a milestone and blueprint for EDM because it was the first to combine repetitive synthesizer loops with a continuous four-on-the-floor bass drum and an off-beat hi-hat, which would become a main feature of techno and house ten years later. Another example is a record entitled Love in C minor, released in 1976 by Parisian Euro disco producer Jean-Marc Cerrone; cited as the first so called "conceptual disco" production and the record from which house, techno, and other underground dance music styles flowed. Yet another example is Yellow Magic Orchestra's work which has been described as "proto-techno"

Around 1983, Sheffield band Cabaret Voltaire began including funk and EDM elements into their sound, and in later years, would come to be described as techno. Nitzer Ebb was an Essex band formed in 1982, which also showed funk and EDM influence on their sound around this time. The Danish band Laid Back released "White Horse" in 1983 with a similar funky electronica sound.

Prehistory
Certain electro-disco and European synthpop productions share with techno a dependence on machine-generated dance rhythms, but such comparisons are not without contention. Efforts to regress further into the past, in search of earlier antecedents, entails a further regression, to the sequenced electronic music of Raymond Scott, whose "The Rhythm Modulator," "The Bass-Line Generator," and "IBM Probe" are considered early examples of techno-like music. In a review of Scott's Manhattan Research Inc. compilation album the English newspaper The Independent suggested that "Scott's importance lies mainly in his realization of the rhythmic possibilities of electronic music, which laid the foundation for all electro-pop from disco to techno." In 2008, a tape from the mid-to-late 1960s by the original composer of the Doctor Who theme Delia Derbyshire, was found to contain music that sounded remarkably like contemporary EDM. Commenting on the tape, Paul Hartnoll, of the dance group Orbital, described the example as "quite amazing," noting that it sounded not unlike something that "could be coming out next week on Warp Records."

Music production practice
Stylistic considerations
In general, techno is very DJ-friendly, being mainly instrumental (commercial varieties being an exception) and is produced with the intention of its being heard in the context of a continuous DJ set, wherein the DJ progresses from one record to the next via a synchronized segue or "mix." Much of the instrumentation in techno emphasizes the role of rhythm over other musical parameters, but the design of synthetic timbres, and the creative use of music production technology in general, are important aspects of the overall aesthetic practice.

Unlike other forms of EDM that tend to be produced with synthesizer keyboards, techno does not always strictly adhere to the harmonic practice of Western music and such strictures are often ignored in favor of timbral manipulation alone. The use of motivic development (though relatively limited) and the employment of conventional musical frameworks is more widely found in commercial techno styles, for example euro-trance, where the template is often an AABA song structure.

The main drum part is almost universally in common time (4/4); meaning 4 quarter note pulses per bar. In its simplest form, time is marked with kicks (bass drum beats) on each quarter-note pulse, a snare or clap on the second and fourth pulse of the bar, with an open hi-hat sound every second eighth note. This is essentially a drum pattern popularized by disco (or even polka) and is common throughout house and trance music as well. The tempo tends to vary between approximately 120 bpm (quarter note equals 120 pulses per minute) and 150 bpm, depending on the style of techno.

Some of the drum programming employed in the original Detroit-based techno made use of syncopation and polyrhythm, yet in many cases the basic disco-type pattern was used as a foundation, with polyrhythmic elaborations added using other drum machine voices. This syncopated-feel (funkiness) distinguishes the Detroit strain of techno from other variants. It is a feature that many DJs and producers still use to differentiate their music from commercial forms of techno, the majority of which tend to be devoid of syncopation. Derrick May has summed up the sound as 'Hi-tech Tribalism': something "very spiritual, very bass oriented, and very drum oriented, very percussive. The original techno music was very hi-tech with a very percussive feel... it was extremely, extremely Tribal. It feels like you're in some sort of hi-tech village."

Compositional techniques

There are many ways to create techno, but the majority will depend upon the use of loop-based step sequencing as a compositional method. Techno musicians, or producers, rather than employing traditional compositional techniques, may work in an improvisatory fashion, often treating the electronic music studio as one large instrument. The collection of devices found in a typical studio will include units that are capable of producing many different sounds and effects. Studio production equipment is generally synchronized using a hardware- or computer-based MIDI sequencer, enabling the producer to combine in one arrangement the sequenced output of many devices. A typical approach to using this type of technology compositionally is to overdub successive layers of material while continuously looping a single measure or sequence of measures. This process will usually continue until a suitable multi-track arrangement has been produced.

Once a single loop-based arrangement has been generated, a producer may then focus on developing how the summing of the overdubbed parts will unfold in time, and what the final structure of the piece will be. Some producers achieve this by adding or removing layers of material at appropriate points in the mix. Quite often, this is achieved by physically manipulating a mixer, sequencer, effects, dynamic processing, equalization, and filtering while recording to a multi-track device. Other producers achieve similar results by using the automation features of computer-based digital audio workstations. Techno can consist of little more than cleverly programmed rhythmic sequences and looped motifs combined with signal processing of one variety or another, frequency filtering being a commonly used process. A more idiosyncratic approach to production is evident in the music of artists such as Twerk and Autechre, where aspects of algorithmic composition are employed in the generation of material.

Retro technology

Instruments used by the original techno producers based in Detroit, many of which are highly sought after on the retro music technology market, include classic drum machines like the Roland TR-808 and TR-909, devices such as the Roland TB-303 bass line generator, and synthesizers such as the Roland SH-101, Kawai KC10, Yamaha DX7, and Yamaha DX100 (as heard on Derrick May's seminal 1987 techno release Nude Photo). Much of the early music sequencing was executed via MIDI (but neither the TR-808 nor the TB-303 had MIDI, only DIN sync) using hardware sequencers such as the Korg SQD1 and Roland MC-50, and the limited amount of sampling that was featured in this early style was accomplished using an Akai S900.

By the mid-1990s TR-808 and TR-909 drum machines had already achieved legendary status, a fact reflected in the prices sought for used devices. During the 1980s, the 808 became the staple beat machine in Hip hop production while the 909 found its home in House music and techno. It was "the pioneers of Detroit techno [who] were making the 909 the rhythmic basis of their sound, and setting the stage for the rise of Roland's vintage Rhythm Composer." In November 1995 the UK music technology magazine Sound on Sound noted:

By May 1996, Sound on Sound was reporting that the popularity of the 808 had started to decline, with the rarer TR-909 taking its place as "the dance floor drum machine to use." This is thought to have arisen for a number of reasons: the 909 gives more control over the drum sounds, has better programming and includes MIDI as standard. Sound on Sound reported that the 909 was selling for between £900 and £1100 and noted that the 808 was still collectible, but maximum prices had peaked at about £700 to £800. Despite this fascination with retro music technology, according to Derrick May "there is no recipe, there is no keyboard or drum machine which makes the best techno, or whatever you want to call it. There never has been. It was down to the preferences of a few guys. The 808 was our preference. We were using Yamaha drum machines, different percussion machines, whatever."

Emulation
In the latter half of the 1990s the demand for vintage drum machines and synthesizers motivated a number of software companies to produce computer-based emulators. One of the most notable was the ReBirth RB-338, produced by the Swedish company Propellerhead and originally released in May 1997. Version one of the software featured two TB-303s and a TR-808 only, but the release of version two saw the inclusion of a TR-909. A Sound on Sound review of the RB-338 V2 in November 1998 noted that Rebirth had been called "the ultimate techno software package" and mentions that it was "a considerable software success story of 1997". In America Keyboard Magazine asserted that ReBirth had "opened up a whole new paradigm: modeled analog synthesizer tones, percussion synthesis, pattern-based sequencing, all integrated in one piece of software". Despite the success of ReBirth RB-338, it was officially taken out of production in September 2005. Propellerhead then made it freely available for download from a website called the "ReBirth Museum". The site also features extensive information about the software's history and development.

In 2001, Propellerhead released Reason V1, a software-based electronic music studio, comprising a 14-input automated digital mixer, 99-note polyphonic 'analogue' synth, classic Roland-style drum machine, sample-playback unit, analogue-style step sequencer, loop player, multitrack sequencer, eight effects processors, and over 500 MB of synthesizer patches and samples. With this release Propellerhead were credited with "creating a buzz that only happens when a product has really tapped into the zeitgeist, and may just be the one that many [were] waiting for." Reason is as of 2018 at version 10.

Technological advances
During the mid to late 90s, as computer technology became more accessible and music software advanced, interacting with music production technology was possible using means that bore little relationship to traditional musical performance practices: for instance, laptop performance (laptronica) and live coding.Collins, N.(2003a), Generative Music and Laptop Performance, Contemporary Music Review: Vol. 22, Issue 4. London: Routledge: 67–79.
By the mid-2000s a number of software-based virtual studio environments had emerged, with products such as Propellerhead's Reason and Ableton Live finding popular appeal. Also during this period software versions of classic devices, that once existed exclusively in the hardware domain, became available for the first time. These software-based music production tools offered viable and cost-effective alternatives to typical hardware-based production studios, and thanks to continued advances in microprocessor technology, it became possible to create high quality music using little more than a single laptop computer. Using highly configurable software tools artists could also easily tailor their production sound by creating personalized software synthesizers, effects modules, and various composition environments. Some of the more popular programs for achieving such ends included commercial releases such as Max/Msp and Reaktor and freeware packages such as Pure Data, SuperCollider, and ChucK. In a certain sense this technological innovation lead to the resurgence of the DIY mentality that was once central to dance music culture.Rietveld, H (1998), Repetitive Beats: Free Parties and the Politics of Contemporary DIY Dance Culture in Britain, in George McKay (ed.), DIY Culture: Party and Protest in Nineties Britain, pp.243–67. London: Verso.Gillmor, D., Technology feeds grassroots media, BBC news report, published Thursday, 9 March 2006, 17:30 GMT. In the 00s these advances democratized music creation and lead to a significant increase in the amount of home-produced music available to the general public via the internet.

Notable techno venues

In 2007, Berghain was cited as "possibly the current world capital of techno, much as E-Werk or Tresor were in their respective heydays". In the 2010s, aside from Berlin, Germany continued to have a thriving techno scene with clubs such as Gewölbe in Cologne, Institut für Zukunft in Leipzig, MMA Club and Blitz Club in Munich, Die Rakete in Nuremberg and Robert Johnson in Offenbach am Main.

In the United Kingdom, Glasgow's Sub Club has been associated with techno since the early 1990s and clubs such as London's Fabric and Egg London have gained notoriety for supporting techno. In the 2010s, a techno scene also emerged in Georgia, with the Bassiani in Tbilisi being the most notable venue.

See also
 Detroit Electronic Music Archive

References

Bibliography

 Anz, P. & Walder, P. (eds.), Techno, Hamburg: Rowohlt, 1999.
 Barr, T., Techno: The Rough Guide, Rough Guides, 2000.
 Brewster B. & Broughton F., Last Night a DJ Saved My Life: The History of the Disc Jockey, Avalon Travel Publishing, 2006,.
 Butler, M.J., Unlocking the Groove: Rhythm, Meter, and Musical Design in Electronic Dance Music, Indiana University Press, 2006.
 Cannon, S. & Dauncey, H., Popular Music in France from Chanson to Techno: Culture, Identity and Society, Ashgate, 2003.
 Collin, M., Altered State: The Story of Ecstasy Culture and Acid House, Serpent's Tail, 1998.
 Cosgrove, S. (a), "Seventh City Techno", The Face (97), p.88, May 1988 (ISSN 0263-1210).
 Cosgrove, S. (b), Techno! The New Dance Sound of Detroit liner notes, 10 Records Ltd. (UK), 1988 (LP: DIXG 75; CD: DIXCD 75).
 Cox, C.(Author), Warner D (Editor), Audio Culture: Readings in Modern Music, Continuum International Publishing Group Ltd., 2004.
 Fritz, J., Rave Culture: An Insider's Overview, Smallfry Press, 2000.
 Kodwo, E., More Brilliant Than the Sun: Adventures in Sonic Fiction, Quartet Books, 1998.
 Nelson, A., Tu, L.T.N., Headlam Hines, A. (eds.), TechniColor: Race, Technology and Everyday Life, New York University Press, 2001.
 Nye, S "Minimal Understandings: The Berlin Decade, The Minimal Continuum, and Debates on the Legacy of German Techno," in Journal of Popular Music Studies 25, no. 2(2013): 154–84.
 Pesch, M. (Author), Weisbeck, M. (Editor), Techno Style: The Album Cover Art, Edition Olms; 5Rev Ed edition, 1998.
 Rietveld, H.C., This is Our House: House Music, Cultural Spaces and Technologies, Ashgate Publishing, Aldershot, 1998.
 Reynolds, S., Energy Flash: a Journey Through Rave Music and Dance Culture, Pan Macmillan, 1998.
 Reynolds, S., Generation Ecstasy: Into the World of Techno and Rave Culture, Routledge, New York 1999; Soft Skull Press, 2012.
 Reynolds, S., Energy Flash: a Journey Through Rave Music and Dance Culture, Faber and Faber, 2013.
 Savage, J., The Hacienda Must Be Built, International Music Publications, 1992.
 Sicko, D., Techno Rebels: The Renegades of Electronic Funk, Billboard Books, 1999.
 Sicko, D., Techno Rebels: The Renegades of Electronic Funk, 2nd ed., Wayne State University Press, 2010.
 St. John, G.(ed.). Rave Culture and Religion, New York: Routledge, 2004..
 St. John, G.(ed.), FreeNRG: Notes From the Edge of the Dance Floor, Common Ground, Melbourne, 2001.
 St John, G. Technomad: Global Raving Countercultures. London: Equinox. 2009. .
 Toop, D., Ocean of Sound, Serpent's Tail, 2001 [new edition].
 Watten, B., The Constructivist Moment: From Material Text to Cultural Poetics, Wesleyan University Press, 2003.

Filmography

 High Tech Soul – Catalog No.: PLX-029; Label: Plexifilm; Released: 19 September 2006; Director: Gary Bredow; Length: 64 minutes.
 Paris/Berlin: 20 Years Of Underground Techno – Label:  Les Films du Garage; Released: 2012; Director: Amélie Ravalec; Length: 52 minutes.
 We Call It Techno! – A documentary about Germany's early Techno scene and culture – Label: Sense Music & Media, Berlin, DE; Released: June 2008; Directors: Maren Sextro & Holger Wick.
 Tresor Berlin: The Vault and the Electronic Frontier'' – Label: Pyramids of London Films; Released 2004; Director: Michael Andrawis; Length: 62 minutes
 Technomania – Released: 1996 (screened at NowHere, an exhibition held at Louisiana Museum of Modern Art, Denmark, between 15 May and 8 September 1996); Director: Franz A. Pandal; Length: 52 minutes.
  – Label: Les Films à Lou; Released: 1996; Director: Dominique Deluze; Length: 63 minutes.

External links
 Techno Live Sets - The #1 resource for Techno sets
 "From the Autobahn to I-94: The Origins of Detroit Techno and Chicago House" – reminiscences in 2005 by techno and house innovators
 Sounds Like Techno – online historical documentary produced by the Australian Broadcasting Corporation (ABC)
 Techno from past years – Oldie but goldie classic techno sets

 
Culture of Detroit
Electronic dance music genres
Subcultures
German styles of music
American styles of music